Telisik is the debut album by Indonesian singer Danilla, released by Orion Records on March 3, 2014. Most of the songs on Telisik were written by Lafa Pratomo who also produced. The album mixes the sounds and arrangements of jazz, bossa nova, and traditional Indonesian music with minimalist, laid-back productions.

Telisik produced four singles: "Buaian", "Ada di Sana", "Berdistraksi", and "Terpaut Oleh Waktu". At the end of the year Rolling Stone Indonesia named it the 18th "Best Indonesian Albums of 2014."

Background and recording
Danilla met Lafa Pratomo in 2012 through some friend. Lafa, a musician/producer, took her under his wings and wrote materials for her to sing. This album could easily be attributed to Lafa as he wrote most of the songs, and later also producing the album. As Danilla so humbly put it, she was "just [a] messenger for his songs". The only writing credits for the singer were on "Oh No! (Trembling Theory)" and "Junko Furuta", which she shared with the producer.

The recording took one and a half-year to finish, with "Junko Furuta" being the longest to complete, taking up three to four months of writing and recording. For promotion, Danilla and Lafa would often record some two to four songs, bootleg it into 50 CDs that they had bought out of their own pockets, and give them out for free at her shows. They later found it easier to promote her album through the internet by uploading it to streaming services such as SoundCloud.

Track listing

Personnel
 Danilla Riyadi – vocals, melodica
 Lafa Pratomo – vocals, guitar
 Christ Stanley – piano
 Aldi Nada Permana – piano
 Edward Julu Hosea – drums
 Jalu Rohanda – bass
 Galang Perdhana – bass
 Dani Kurnia – cello
 Brury Effendy – trumpet

References

2014 debut albums